Lasme is a surname. Notable people with the surname include:

Bryan Lasme (born 1998), French footballer 
Stéphane Lasme (born 1982), Gabonese basketball player